Kulpa may refer to:

Places 
 Kulpa, Astrakhan Oblast, Russia
 Kulpa, Balaghat district, Madhya Pradesh, India

People 
 Dick Kulpa, American cartoonist
 Ron Kulpa (born 1968), American umpire in Major League Baseball. 
 Zenon Kulpa (born 1946) is a Polish academic